Smearwort is a common name for several plants and may refer to:

Aristolochia rotunda, in the family Aristolochiaceae
Blitum bonus-henricus, in the family Amaranthaceae